Begonia froebelii is a species of plant in the family Begoniaceae. It is endemic to Ecuador.  Its natural habitats are subtropical or tropical dry forests and subtropical or tropical moist montane forests. It is threatened by habitat loss.

References

Flora of Ecuador
froebelii
Near threatened plants
Taxonomy articles created by Polbot